Terror Train is a 1980 slasher film directed by Roger Spottiswoode in his directorial debut and starring Jamie Lee Curtis, Ben Johnson, and Hart Bochner. Set aboard a moving train on New Year's Eve, the film follows a group of pre-medical school students holding a costume party who are targeted by a killer who steals their costumes after murdering some students to avoid being caught. It features supporting performances from Sandee Currie, Anthony Sherwood, and David Copperfield.

The concept for the film was based on an idea by executive producer Daniel Grodnik, who sought to "make Halloween on a train". A full-length script for the film was composed by T. Y. Drake, and production was initiated within four months. The film was shot in Montreal between late November and late December 1979, shortly after Curtis had completed filming for Prom Night (1980).

An independently produced film, Terror Train was purchased for distribution by the major studio 20th Century Fox, who had yet to release a slasher film; the studio was able to supply an expansive marketing campaign for the film that cost an estimated $5 million. It was released theatrically in the United States on October 3, 1980, grossing $8 million during its theatrical run.

Plot

At a Northern Illinois University fraternity's New Year's Eve party, a reluctant Alana Maxwell is coerced into participating in a prank: she lures the shy and awkward pledge Kenny Hampson into a darkened room on the promise of a sexual liaison. However, some other students have placed a woman's corpse (stolen from the university medical school during the Christmas vacation) in the bed instead. Kenny is traumatized by the prank and is sent to a psychiatric hospital.

Three years later, the members of the same fraternities and sororities hold a New Year's Eve costume party aboard a train. Class clown Ed is disguised as Groucho Marx; Prank ringleader Doc Manley is disguised as a monk; Jackson is disguised as an alien lizard; Mitchy, Doc's girlfriend and Alana's best friend, is disguised as a witch; and Alana's boyfriend Mo is disguised as a bird. Also along are Carne, the train conductor, and a magician hired to entertain the crowd.

Ed is murdered prior to boarding and the killer dons Ed's Groucho Marx mask, allowing him to board the train unnoticed. Ed's corpse is then crushed by the train when it takes off. As the train journeys into the wilderness, the killer wanders amongst the students, who believe him to be Ed. In the sleeper bathroom, he murders Jackson by smashing his head into a mirror. Carne finds Jackson's bloodied body in the bathroom, still wearing the lizard costume. When Carne returns to the scene with the brakeman Charlie, the killer has hidden Jackson's body and is now posing in the lizard costume; as he appears conscious, Charlie assures Carne that the partygoer is merely drunk.

Mitchy goes with the killer, whom she believes to be Jackson, to a compartment where she attempts to seduce him. As she closes her eyes, he caresses her with Jackson's severed hand before he slashes her throat. Carne subsequently finds her corpse in the compartment. Alana stumbles upon the scene, and Carne informs her that Mitchy is dead. During a magic show held by the magician and his female assistant, Doc finds Mo dead, though the partying onlookers assume the scene to be a prank. Carne and Charlie stop the train, and find a bloody hat. It belongs to Shovels, a worker. Carne realizes that Shovels and another crew member are dead. Carne and Charlie then sequester the students in one car; while doing so, two pullman porters find the corpse of Pet, another student.

Suspecting Kenny may be involved, Alana recalls the prank to Doc, and recounts her attempt to visit Kenny at the psychiatric hospital, where she learned that Kenny may have been involved in a murder before the prank. Doc subsequently seals himself inside a room in the sleeper car where the killer is hiding, and is decapitated. Shortly after, Alana and Carne find his body. Believing the magician may be Kenny in disguise, Alana notifies Carne, who goes to lock him inside the parlor car; there he finds the magician's female assistant, but Carne and the porters are unable to find the magician.

Alana is sequestered in a locked compartment for her safety, which the masked killer infiltrates, killing the chief porter with one of the magician's prop swords before arming himself with an axe. Alana is pursued through the train. While in-between cars, she manages to push the killer overboard, unaware that he has managed to hold on below. Later, after finding the magician's dead body in his sword box, Alana runs through the train car and finds Charlie in the baggage car seated with his head resting in his hands. She tells him the magician is dead, and lays her head on the table, when he grabs her by her wrists. Alana realizes it is Kenny, who is indeed the killer, dressed in Charlie's uniform. Kenny removes the uniform cap to reveal a blonde wig, and Alana realizes he has been posing in drag as the magician's female assistant.

Alana apologizes to Kenny about the prank, but he refuses to accept her apology about the prank and forces her to kiss him. However, the kiss causes Kenny to relive his memories from the prank and suffer a mental breakdown, unwittingly leaving himself vulnerable to an arriving Carne, who beats Kenny with a shovel, causing him to fall out the open door of the baggage car to his death. His body lands in a nearly frozen river and floats away as the train roars off.

Cast

Themes
The motivation for the villain in Terror Train, similarly to other slasher films, is based on revenge; however, as film scholar John Kenneth Muir notes, the film's central organizing principle is "magic, or the often undetectable gulf between reality and illusion.... In other words, characters live and die in Terror Train based, in large part, on how they perceive the reality or non-reality around them". Muir adds: "If the would-be victims can see through the illusion, they tend to survive. If they can't do so, they die. It's as simple that, but this approach makes Terror Train a more complex and layered film than the average slasher picture".

Production

Conception
Producer Daniel Grodnik had the idea for the film's central narrative, which he had wanted to be "like Halloween on a train". Grodnik had been a friend of Halloween director John Carpenter and producer Debra Hill, both of whom gave him their blessing when he told them of his idea. Grodnik pitched the film to American producer Sandy Howard, who was impressed by the concept.

The film was the first motion picture directed by Roger Spottiswoode (a former editor for Sam Peckinpah), who would go on to make such films as Turner & Hooch (1989), Air America (1990), and Tomorrow Never Dies (1997). Spottiswoode was hired to direct the film by Sandy Howard on the condition that he also edit the film (though Anne Henderson was later brought in to edit). Because it was made under a Canadian tax shelter, Daniel Grodnik was appointed executive producer, as he was legally unable to serve as a primary producer.

There was no stage show magician in the original script, but producer Howard was a fan of magic tricks and illusions, so a magician character was written in. Copperfield's character becomes the suspect at one point of the film, but it turns out to be a red herring when the real killer is revealed to be Kenny Hampson. There is some confusion about David Copperfield's character's name. In the film, the Conductor calls out to him twice as "Ken", but this is when it is believed by him and the passengers that he is Kenny Hampson, the murderer. Additionally, his assistant calls out to him as "Ken", but since his assistant is Kenny in disguise, this could have been an intentional misdirection. In the credits, he is simply listed as "The Magician".

Casting
Producer Grodnik sought Jamie Lee Curtis for the lead role of Alana Maxwell based on her performance in the successful Halloween, released two years prior. Curtis was also signed on to star in Paul Lynch's Prom Night, which she filmed in Toronto two months before production began on Terror Train. Veteran actor Ben Johnson was cast as Carne, the train conductor, whom Grodnik said was "amused" to have been in a horror film amongst such a young cast.

The majority of the supporting cast was made of Canadian actors, including Hart Bochner, Sandee Currie and Anthony Sherwood. The film included a number of untrained actors, including Derek MacKinnon in the role of the villain, as well as illusionist David Copperfield as the Magician, and rock singer Vanity as one of the coed partygoers.

Set construction

To create the train for the film, the producers leased an actual Canadian Pacific Railway locomotive from the Steamtown Foundation in Bellows Falls, Vermont. The train's engine was renumbered from its original 1293 to 1881, and, along with five passenger cars, painted black with silver stripes. Afterward, the Steamtown Foundation reverted the engine back to its original number and had it restored to a historic color and lettering scheme. Production designer Glenn Bywdwell crafted the interiors of the train in an Art Deco style. As of January 2021, Canadian Pacific Railway No. 1293 continues to be an "operable locomotive".

Filming
Principal photography for Terror Train mainly took place in and around Montreal, Quebec, Canada. The shoot began on November 21, 1979, and was completed on December 23. The bulk of the film's train sequences were shot first, while the film's opening sequence was shot on December 22, the penultimate day of the shoot; filming of it took place at a real fraternity house belonging to McGill University. The final day of shooting (December 23) consisted of a small crew completing the footage of Kenny's body plummeting from the train into a frozen river below, which was shot on location in New Hampshire, United States. The stunt man was reportedly unable to withstand the freezing temperature of the water, leading art director Guy Comtois to play the part of the dead killer instead.

The interior train sequences posed numerous obstacles for the crew, specifically cinematographer John Alcott, who devised a unique method of lighting Terror Train given the limited space and scant natural lighting of the sets: He rewired the entire train and mounted individual dimmers on the exteriors of the carriage cars. Utilizing a variety of bulbs with different wattages, and controlling them with the external dimmers, Alcott could light the set in a very fast, efficient manner. At times, Alcott also used medical lights-"pen torches"- to hand light the actors' faces, as well as Christmas lights. To capture some of the film's footage, Alcott used a small lens he had previously used while shooting Barry Lyndon. To achieve the rocking motion of a real train on film, a crew was appointed to push on each side of the stationary train car in order for the interior sequences to appear as though they were taking place on a moving train.

Taking a cue from director John Ford, Ben Johnson originally asked director Spottiswoode to give his character Carne less dialogue in Terror Train, rather than more. Jamie Lee Curtis also provided input in regard to her character during the filming process. The kissing sequence between her character and that of the killer was an idea that she originated: "I just thought that if she kissed him that it would bring a lot of tenderness to the scene and to the film. The kiss was totally my idea. All during filming, I was looking for ways to make my character more interesting but there weren't many opportunities because most of the film was about the action and the killer".

Canadian actor Derek MacKinnon, who played the masked killer, appears in 11 scenes in Terror Train, wearing a different costume or masked disguise in each scene, including his real character of Kenny. There was friction between director Spottiswoode and MacKinnon during the shoot, which Spottiswoode claimed was a result of his inexperience:  "He wasn't an actor. He was a transvestite from the streets of Montreal, and he wasn't familiar with the concepts of a contract and showing up for work on time. In a strange way though he did a pretty good job. He was familiar with that world of cheap theater and was strangely effective".

Release
The film was purchased for theatrical release in the United States by 20th Century Fox, who had recently garnered attention with the release of Star Wars (1977). The studio spent an estimated $5 million on an advertising campaign for the film, which would be their only foray into the slasher film sub-genre during its peak years. The campaign included billboards and trade advertisements, as well as several posters: the first one-sheet featured the killer dressed in the Groucho Marx mask, brandishing a knife; a second one-sheet emphasized the film's college youth setting, including the same image of the killer in addition to a bonfire and a train in the foreground.

Reception

Box office
Terror Train opened in the United States on October 3, 1980, and grossed an estimate $8 million at the box office on a budget of $3.5 million.

Critical response
Variety deemed the film "competent" in a mildly positive review, while Roger Ebert gave the film one out of four stars, writing: "The classic horror films of the 1930s appealed to the intelligence of its audiences, to their sense of humor and irony. Movies like Terror Train, and all of its sordid predecessors and its rip-offs still to come, just don't care. They're a series of sensations, strung together on a plot. Any plot will do. Just don't forget the knife, and the girl, and the blood". However, he conceded that "it's not a rock-bottom-budget, schlock exploitation film". Ed Blank of the Pittsburgh Press criticized the film for its lack of characterization, summarizing: "Terror Train. A neat name. A nothing movie".

A review in the Los Angeles Times praised the film's atmosphere and characterized it as "stylish, scary fun". Richard Corliss of Time also praised the film's style, calling it "sleek and eerie". Bill Kelley of the Fort Lauderdale News was critical of the film's "lapses in logic" and clichés, but ultimately deemed it "a respectable (if that's the word) exploitation movie". Jacqi Tully of the Arizona Daily Star wrote a similarly favorable review of the film, praising it for its pacing, setting, performances, and Copperfield's magic tricks. Writing for the Statesman Journal, Ron Cowan commended the cinematography and noted that although the film "starts fairly clumsily, [it] does manage some gripping moments toward the last".

Contemporary internet film guide AllMovie praised John Alcott's cinematography, but concluded "Terror Train is too mediocre a piece of work to raise interest from anyone but the genre's most devoted fans", while Time Out London called it "better than most of its kind". Leonard Maltin concurred, claiming that the "stylish photography and the novelty of the killer donning the costume of each successive victim lift this slightly above most in this disreputable genre". Film scholar Adam Rockoff praised the film for its "style and oppressive atmosphere". Horror fiction scholar John Kenneth Muir also praised the film in his book Horror Films of the 1980s: "The thrill of a picture like Terror Train is the shrewd manner in which it plays against audience expectations; the sense that the slasher film paradigm gives it parameters which it can then undercut, subvert, and if needs be, violate".

On the review aggregator website Rotten Tomatoes, Terror Train holds a 40% approval rating based on 15 critic reviews, with an average rating of 4.9/10.

Home media
The film was first released on VHS home video in 1988 by CBS/Fox Video. The film was released twice on DVD by 20th Century Fox; once on September 7, 2004 as a single edition release and again on September 9, 2008 in a triple pack alongside Candyman 2 and the original The Fog.

Shout! Factory released a collector's edition Blu-ray and DVD combo-pack under their Scream Factory label on October 16, 2012. This Blu-ray edition was out of print five years later in December. Scorpion Releasing released a new limited edition Blu-ray edition on July 22, 2019, exclusively through Ronin Flix. Scorpion released a general retail Blu-ray edition of the film on April 7, 2020, in association with Kino Lorber. Unlike the previous home media releases, the Scorpion Releasing Blu-ray edition featured the second United Artists logo at the beginning of the film.

In the UK, 88 Films released a limited-edition Blu-ray on November 4, 2019, with a new HD transfer plus extra bonus content.

Remake
A remake of Terror Train, set on Halloween, was produced by Tubi and Canadian production company Incendo Productions. It was also shot in Montreal and was released on Tubi's streaming platform on October 21, 2022. The film was produced by Graham Ludlow and Kaleigh Kavanagh, directed by Philippe Gagnon, and written by Ian Carpenter and Aaron Martin. Included in the cast are Robyn Alomar as Alana, Tim Rozon as the magician, and Mary Walsh as Carne. The remake scored 20% on Rotten Tomatoes, receiving seven negative ratings and one positive one from film critics. But Robyn Alomar was praised for her breakout performance. The sequel Terror Train 2 was released on Tubi just two months later.

See also
 List of films set on trains
 List of New Year's Eve films

Notes

References

Works cited

External links
 
 
 

1980 films
1980 horror films
1980s slasher films
1980s teen horror films
20th Century Fox films
American slasher films
American independent films
American films about revenge
Canadian slasher films
Canadian independent films
Canadian films about revenge
Cross-dressing in American films
Necrophilia in film
Films set around New Year
Films set on trains
Films about fraternities and sororities
Films about fratricide and sororicide
Films about magic and magicians
Films about mass murder
Films about pranks
Films shot in New Hampshire
Films shot in Montreal
Films directed by Roger Spottiswoode
Films scored by John Mills-Cockell
Holiday horror films
1980 directorial debut films
1980s English-language films
American exploitation films
1980s American films
1980s Canadian films